TGM SV Jügesheim was a German football club in Rodgau, Hesse.

History
The club was formed in 2004 out of the merger of the gymnastics club Turngemeinde Jügesheim established on 22 July 1888 and Sportverein Jügesheim formed in September 1915 after the collapse of the local football side Teutonia Jügesheim. TGM and SV eventually merged to form the later-day association where the footballers became part of a sports club that characterized itself as a "family team" and included departments for basketball, bowling, gymnastics, hiking, judo and Jiu-Jitsu, cross country running, athletics, dance, table tennis, and volleyball.

Jügesheim played the 2001–02 season in the Oberliga Hessen (IV), but over the next two years slipped to the Bezirksoberliga Frankfurt Ost (VI), before returning to Landesliga level play in 2006. In 2011 they were promoted to the Hessenliga and in 2014 they won the league but financial and other constraints forced themselves to drop down two levels to the Gruppenliga (VII). The club was merged later that year into Turngesellschaft Jügesheim and became Jügesheimer Sport- und Kulturverein Rodgau. 

The Jügesheimer women's team captured the Oberliga Hessen title in each of the last three seasons, as well as the Hessenpokal (Hesse Cup) in 2006 season. The cup win earned the team a place in the Women's DFB-Pokal where they were put out in the second round by second division side FF USV Jena. The next season they took part in the promotion round for the women's 2. Bundesliga-Süd. They were unsuccessful in the attempt, but qualified for the new Regionalliga Süd (III).

Honours
The club's honours:

Men
 Hessenliga (V)
 Champions: 2014
 Runners-up: 2013
 Verbandsliga Hessen-Süd
 Champions: 2011
 Runners-up: 1998, 2001
 Bezirksoberliga Frankfurt-Ost
 Runners-up: 2005
 Hesse Cup
 Runners-up: 1951

Women's team
 Frauen-Oberliga Hessen (III)
 Champions: 2005, 2006, 2007
 Frauen-Hessenpokal
 Winners: 2006

Recent managers
Recent managers of the club:

Recent seasons
The recent season-by-season performance of the club:

 With the introduction of the Regionalligas in 1994 and the 3. Liga in 2008 as the new third tier, below the 2. Bundesliga, all leagues below dropped one tier. Also in 2008, a large number of football leagues in Hesse were renamed, with the Oberliga Hessen becoming the Hessenliga, the Landesliga becoming the Verbandsliga, the Bezirksoberliga becoming the Gruppenliga and the Bezirksliga becoming the Kreisoberliga.

References

External links
 Maingau Energie Stadion, pictures of the arena
 TGM SV Jügesheim at Weltfussball.de 
 Das deutsche Fußball-Archiv  historical German domestic league tables

Defunct football clubs in Germany
Defunct football clubs in Hesse
Football clubs in Germany
Association football clubs established in 1888
Association football clubs disestablished in 2014
1888 establishments in Germany
2014 disestablishments in Germany